Nicholas William Adams (born 16 October 1986) is a professional footballer who plays as a winger and wing back for Northern Premier League Premier Division club Radcliffe. Although he was born in England, he has represented Wales under-21 at international level.

Adams began his professional career at Bury in 2005 and has now had three spells there. He has also played for Bury, Leicester City, Brentford, Rochdale, Crawley Town, Rotherham United and Carlisle United.

Career

Bury

Adams was born in Bolton, Greater Manchester. Adams progressed through the Youth and Centre of Excellence system at Bury and shot to fame with a debut goal against Darlington as he made his first-team debut in a 1–0 home win in October 2005. After the match, Adams debut performance was praised by Chris Casper saying "I'm made up for young Nicky Adams, as he has really worked hard on his game, he's run himself into the ground for the team, and he took the goal well." Adams earned more playing time in the first team at Bury. The next season, Adams scored his second goal with an unstoppable shot from 35 yards in a 3–0 win over Grimsby Town on 26 August 2006. After the match, Adams spoke out about the goal, saying "It wasn't bad for a tap in". At the end of the season, Adams signed a new contract. The next season, Adams was soon on a goalscoring form, unlike his two season at Bury, and scored twelve goals this season, including his first brace in a 3–0 win over Barnet on 3 November 2007. After the match, Adams was named man of the match and was praised by Casper. At the end of the season, Adams won the Young player of the year, having received the most votes. Having won the Young player of the year, Adams was offered a new deal to stay at Bury but in June, Adams turned down a deal.

Leicester City
Adams joined Leicester City for an initial £100,000 which could rise to £225,000, a deal which was completed on 1 July 2008, with the player signing a three-year contract. Three months after joining Leicester City, the club was ordered to pay £100,000 for Adams, after both parties failed to agree a fee He became Nigel Pearson's third signing of that day after Michael Morrison and Lloyd Dyer. Adams made his debut in a League Cup match against Stockport on 12 August 2008, in which Leicester won 1–0. His league debut came in a 3–1 win over Tranmere Rovers on 23 August. On 2 September 2008, Adams scored his first goal in a Football League Trophy, as Leicester City beat Hartlepool United. Soon after, his playing time at Leicester City is soon reduced and need to join a club on loan to get regular first-team football. The next season, Adams forms at Leicester City didn't produced well, like he did at Bury, as he used more often on the bench. But in the second round of a League Cup, Adams scored his first goal of the season in a 2–1 loss against Preston North End.

Loans
On 19 January 2009, Adams joined Rochdale on loan for a month, scoring on his debut in a 3–2 away defeat to Dagenham & Redbridge on 24 January. On 19 February, Adams extended his loan at Rochdale by a further month. On 23 March 2009, Adams made a return to Leicester after the club wants him back despite desire to stay.

On 15 January 2010, he was loaned to Leyton Orient for one month. Having impressed at Leyton Orient with six appearances, Adams was recalled by Leicester City. Manager Geraint Williams was disappointed to see Adams being recalled. Shortly returning, Adams would be used often, when coming on as a substitute for the last five games towards the end of the season.

Brentford
Though, Adams wanted to stay at Leicester City to fight for his place in the first team. However, on 19 August 2010, Adams signed for Brentford. He made his debut coming off the bench in the 1–1 draw at Swindon on 21 August 2010.

Rochdale
On 14 October 2010, Adams joined Rochdale on loan, having failed to settle in London with Brentford. In January, Adams moved to Rochdale on loan. After the move, Adams said joining Rochdale could breathe new life into his football career. Two days later, Adams made his debut, providing the assist which led to an own-goal for Byron Anthony, in a 2–1 loss against Bristol Rovers. Adams went on to provide a further 14 assists. When the transfer window opened, Adams signed on a permanent basis with Rochdale, having penned a two-and-a-half-year contract on 1 January 2011.

The following season, Adams continued to be in the first team. On 10 September 2011, Adams scored his first goal but was soon sent-off after a second bookable offence, in a 4–2 win against his former club Bury, followed his second on 19 November 2011, in a 1–0 win over Preston. He since scored against Charlton and Exeter City. However, Rochdale ware relegated to League Two after two seasons in League One. Just before the season ended, Adams was placed on a transfer list.

Crawley Town
On 8 June 2012, Adams joined newly promoted League One side Crawley Town on a free transfer. After joining, Adams expressed his delight of moving down to the South, despite having previously failed to settle whilst at Brentford. In the first round of the Football League Cup, Adams scored on his debut and set up a goal for John Akinde in a 2–2 draw against Millwall, which they won on penalties. On the opening game of the season, Adams made his debut in a 3–0 win over Scunthorpe United; on 29 September 2012, Adams scored his first goal in a 2–0 win over Carlisle United. In the following three games, Adams scored four goals, including a brace and assist for Hope Akpan in a 3–2 win over Bury on 13 October 2012. In the second round of the FA Cup, Adams scored Crawley's first goal in a 3–0 win over Chelmsford City and in the third round against Reading, Adams gave Crawley Town an early lead with a stunning strike from outside the area after just 14 seconds, though Crawley lost 3–1. After the match, Adams says his first minute screamer was 'the best goal of his career'. Adams started all of Crawley's league games during the 2012–13 season, scoring 8 goals. He made 24 league appearances for Crawley in the 2013–14 season, scoring once.

Rotherham United
On 31 January 2014, Adams joined Rotherham United on a two-and-a-half-year contract. His first appearance for Rotherham came on 15 February 2014 in a 2–1 victory over Stevenage; he came on as a 79th-minute substitute. He made 15 appearances for Rotherham, scoring once.

Return to Bury 
On 16 May 2014, Adams returned to Bury on a three-year contract for an undisclosed fee. Despite making 38 league appearances during the 2014–15 season, Adams was transfer listed at the end of the season.

Northampton Town 
On 22 May 2015, Adams joined Northampton Town on a three-year contract.

Carlisle United 
On 24 May 2016, Adams joined Carlisle United on a two-year contract.

Third contract at Bury
On 15 May 2018, Adams re-signed for Bury, who were newly relegated to League Two, on a one-year contract. This contract was extended in March 2019, but he left the club in June 2019 following a dispute.

Return to Northampton Town 
On 5 June 2019, it was announced that Adams had rejoined Northampton Town on a free transfer, signing a two-year deal.

Oldham Athletic
On 22 January 2021, Adams joined League Two side Oldham Athletic on a contract until June 2022. Following relegation, Adams was offered a new contract but the two parties could not agree terms and Adams left the club.

Radcliffe
In June 2022, Adams joined Radcliffe.

International career
Despite being born in England, Adams chose to play for the Wales U-21, making his debut on 20 November 2007 against France.

Career statistics

Honours
Leicester City
Football League One: 2008–09

Northampton Town
Football League Two: 2015–16
EFL League Two play-offs: 2020

Bury
EFL League Two runner-up: 2018–19

Individual
PFA Team of the Year: 2016–17 League Two, 2019–20 League Two

References

External links

Profile  at the Bury F.C. website

1986 births
Living people
Footballers from Bolton
English footballers
Welsh footballers
Wales under-21 international footballers
Association football midfielders
Bury F.C. players
Leicester City F.C. players
Rochdale A.F.C. players
Leyton Orient F.C. players
Brentford F.C. players
Crawley Town F.C. players
Rotherham United F.C. players
Northampton Town F.C. players
Carlisle United F.C. players
Oldham Athletic A.F.C. players
Radcliffe F.C. players
English Football League players
English people of Welsh descent